Ponticella is one of 6 Parroquias, or population entities, in the Municipality of Villayón, in  Asturias, Spain.

Geography 

Ponticella is a Parroquia with 450 inhabitants, as of 2007, and an area of 53,16 km2. It is at an elevation of 456 meters. The village is 14 km away from the capital Villayón.

Rivers and Lakes 
The Rivers Rio de Llouxeira and Rio Cabornel pass the Parroquia together with many smaller streams.

The (Waterfalls) Cascada de Méxica are found in this area.

Traffic 
The area includes the next airport Oviedo.

Economy 
Agriculture has dominated the region for hundreds of years.

Climate 
Warm summers and smooth, seldom hard winters. In autumn strong storms are possible.

Points of interest 
 Castro de Illaso
 Cascada de Méxica

Smaller villages in the Parroquia 
 Auguamaroza 3 Hab. (2007) 
 Argolellas 11 Hab. (2007) 
 Barandón  4 Hab. (2007)  
 El Bedural 5 Hab. (2007) 
 Busmayor   17 Hab. (2007) 
 Bustalfoyao 17 Hab. (2007) 
 A Candaosa 11 Hab. (2007) 
 As Candaosas 14 Hab. (2007) 
 Castaedo 23 Hab. (2007) 
 El Couz 20 Hab. (2007) 
 Iyaso 37 Hab. (2007) 
 Llanteiro 5 Hab. (2007)  
 Llouredo 26 Hab. (2007) 
 Murias 6 Hab. (2007) 
 Ponticella 54 Hab. (2007) 
 Poxos 
 Solares 16 Hab. (2007) 
 Trabada 45 Hab. (2007) 
 Valdedo 70 Hab. (2007)
 Valle 22 Hab. (2007)

References 

Populationsdata > INE

External links 
 Citypage
 Infopage with Pictures
 Rustic accommodations
  Asturian Map
 The way to Mexica waterfall

Towns in Spain
Parishes in Villayón
Towns in Asturias